KMID (channel 2) is a television station licensed to Midland, Texas, United States, serving as the ABC affiliate for the Permian Basin area. It is owned by Nexstar Media Group, which provides certain services to Odessa-licensed Fox affiliate KPEJ-TV (channel 24) under a shared services agreement (SSA) with Mission Broadcasting. Both stations share studios on Windview Street (along I-20) in southwestern Odessa, while KMID's transmitter is located on FM 1788 in rural southeastern Andrews County.

History
KMID-TV went on the air on December 18, 1953, making it the longest-running station in the Midland–Odessa market. It carried programming from all four networks, but was a primary NBC affiliate. It lost CBS to KOSA-TV (channel 7) in 1956 and lost ABC to KWES-TV (channel 9, then known as KVKM) in 1958. On September 5, 1982, KMID became an ABC affiliate when it swapped its NBC affiliation with channel 9 (by then known as KMOM, which became KTPX simultaneous with the switch). Lorimar-Telepictures sold KMID and two of its sister stations, KSPR in Springfield, Missouri, and KCPM-TV (now KNVN) in Chico–Redding, California, to Goltrin Communications in 1987. In 1988, Goltrin sold all three stations to Davis Goldfarb Communications. Cottonwood Communications bought the station in 1995. KMID, along with KSPR and KCPM, was purchased by GOCOM Communications in 1997. KMID was acquired by current owner Nexstar Broadcasting in 2000.

Since 1974, KMID was known as "Big 2", but adopted the "ABC2" moniker in early 2004. In part because many Permian Basin residents still called the station "Big 2", though, that nickname was revived in 2009, only to be scrapped once more on December 12, 2015, in favor of "Local 2". The "Big 2" branding returned again in June 2018.

In 2003, KMID dropped weekend evening newscasts, which were the lowest-rated newscasts in the Permian Basin. In late 2006, the Sunday night news broadcasts were reinstated.

On April 24, 2013, Communications Corporation of America announced the sale of its entire group to Nexstar. KPEJ was to be sold to Mission Broadcasting, but on June 6, 2014, Nexstar announced that it would instead sell KPEJ-TV to a new minority-owned company, Marshall Broadcasting Group (marking the company's first television station acquisitions), for $58.5 million. Nexstar would operate KPEJ under a shared services agreement, forming a virtual duopoly with KMID. The sale was completed on January 1, 2015.

Syndicated programming
Syndicated programming on KMID includes The Rachael Ray Show, Judge Judy, AgDay, Jeopardy!, and Wheel of Fortune, among others.

Notable former on-air staff
Dayna Devon
Mike Emanuel
Edward Platt

Technical information

Subchannels
The station's digital signal is multiplexed:

Analog-to-digital conversion
KMID shut down its analog signal, over VHF channel 2, on June 12, 2009, the official date in which full-power television stations in the United States transitioned from analog to digital broadcasts under federal mandate. The station's digital signal remained on its pre-transition UHF channel 26. Through the use of PSIP, digital television receivers display the station's virtual channel as its former VHF analog channel 2.

See also
Channel 2 virtual TV stations in the United States
Channel 26 digital TV stations in the United States

References

External links

ABC network affiliates
Grit (TV network) affiliates
Laff (TV network) affiliates
Ion Mystery affiliates
Television channels and stations established in 1953
MID
1953 establishments in Texas
Nexstar Media Group